This article is a list of things named after Jean d'Alembert:

Mathematics and natural sciences 
 d'Alembert–Euler condition
d'Alembert criterion
 d'Alembert's equation
 d'Alembert force
 d'Alembert's formula
 d'Alembert's solution, see Reduction of order or d'Alembert's formula
 d'Alembert operator
d'Alembertian
 d'Alembert's paradox
 d'Alembert's principle
 d'Alembert system
 d'Alembert's theorem

Fiction and literature
 "Le rêve de D'Alembert" ("D'Alembert's Dream"), by Denis Diderot.
 D'Alembert's Principle, a novel by Andrew Crumey (1996).

Others
 Tree of Diderot and d'Alembert
 Ile d'Alembert, island better known by the English name of Lipson Island.

Alembert